In algebraic topology, a peripheral  subgroup for a space-subspace pair X ⊃ Y is a certain subgroup of the fundamental group of the complementary space, π1(X − Y).  Its conjugacy class is an invariant of the pair (X,Y).  That is, any homeomorphism (X, Y) → (X′, Y′) induces an isomorphism π1(X − Y) → π1(X′ − Y′) taking peripheral subgroups to peripheral subgroups.

A peripheral subgroup consists of loops in X − Y which are peripheral to Y, that is, which stay "close to" Y (except when passing to and from the basepoint).  When an ordered set of generators for a peripheral subgroup is specified, the subgroup and generators are collectively called a peripheral system for the pair (X, Y).

Peripheral systems are used in knot theory as a complete algebraic invariant of knots.  There is a systematic way to choose generators for a peripheral subgroup of a knot in 3-space, such that distinct knot types always have algebraically distinct peripheral systems.  The generators in this situation are called a longitude and a meridian of the knot complement.

Full definition 

Let Y be a subspace of the path-connected topological space X, whose complement X − Y is path-connected.  Fix a basepoint x ∈ X − Y.  For each path component Vi of X − Y∩Y, choose a path γi from x to a point in Vi.  An element [α] ∈ π1(X − Y, x) is called peripheral with respect to this choice if it is represented by a loop in U ∪  ∪ iγi for every neighborhood U of Y.  The set of all peripheral elements with respect to a given choice forms a subgroup of π1(X − Y, x), called a peripheral subgroup.

In the diagram, a peripheral loop would start at the basepoint x and travel down the path γ until it's inside the neighborhood U of the subspace Y.  Then it would move around through U however it likes (avoiding Y).  Finally it would return to the basepoint x via γ.  Since U can be a very tight envelope around Y, the loop has to stay close to Y.

Any two peripheral subgroups of π1(X − Y, x), resulting from different choices of paths γi, are conjugate in π1(X − Y, x).  Also, every conjugate of a peripheral subgroup is itself peripheral with respect to some choice of paths γi.  Thus the peripheral subgroup's conjugacy class is an invariant of the pair (X, Y).

A peripheral subgroup, together with an ordered set of generators, is called a peripheral system for the pair (X, Y).  If a systematic method is specified for selecting these generators, the peripheral system is, in general, a stronger invariant than the peripheral subgroup alone.  In fact, it is a complete invariant for knots.

In knot theory 

The peripheral subgroups for a tame knot K in R3 are isomorphic to Z ⊕ Z if the knot is nontrivial, Z if it is the unknot.  They are generated by two elements, called a longitude [l] and a meridian [m].  (If K is the unknot, then [l] is a power of [m], and a peripheral subgroup is generated by [m] alone.)  A longitude is a loop that runs from the basepoint x along a path γ to a point y on the boundary of a tubular neighborhood of K, then follows along the tube, making one full lap to return to y, then returns to x via γ.  A meridian is a loop that runs from x to y, then circles around the tube, returns to y, then returns to x.  (The property of being a longitude or meridian is well-defined because the tubular neighborhoods of a tame knot are all ambiently isotopic.)  Note that every knot group has a longitude and meridian; if [l] and [m] are a longitude and meridian in a given peripheral subgroup, then so are [l]·[m]n and [m]−1, respectively (n ∈ Z).  In fact, these are the only longitudes and meridians in the subgroup, and any pair will generate the subgroup.

A peripheral system for a knot can be selected by choosing generators [l] and [m] such that the longitude l has linking number 0 with K, and the ordered triple (m′,l′,n) is a positively oriented basis for R3, where m′ is the tangent vector of m based at y, l′ is the tangent vector of l based at y, and n is an outward-pointing normal to the tube at y.  (Assume that representatives l and m are chosen to be smooth on the tube and cross only at y.)  If so chosen, the peripheral system is a complete invariant for knots, as proven in [Waldhausen 1968].

Example: Square knot versus granny knot 
The square knot and the granny knot are distinct knots, and have non-homeomorphic complements.  However, their knot groups are isomorphic.  Nonetheless, it was shown in [Fox 1961] that no isomorphism of their knot groups carries a peripheral subgroup of one to a peripheral subgroup of the other.  Thus the peripheral subgroup is sufficient to distinguish these knots.

Example: Trefoil versus mirror trefoil 
The trefoil and its mirror image are distinct knots, and consequently there is no orientation-preserving homeomorphism between their complements.  However, there is an orientation-reversing self-homeomorphism of R3 that carries the trefoil to its mirror image.  This homeomorphism induces an isomorphism of the knot groups, carrying a peripheral subgroup to a peripheral subgroup, a longitude to a longitude, and a meridian to a meridian.  Thus the peripheral subgroup is not sufficient to distinguish these knots.  Nonetheless, it was shown in [Dehn 1914] that no isomorphism of these knot groups preserves the peripheral system selected as described above.  An isomorphism will, at best, carry one generator to a generator going the "wrong way".  Thus the peripheral system can distinguish these knots.

Wirtinger presentation 
It is possible to express longitudes and meridians of a knot as words in the Wirtinger presentation of the knot group, without reference to the knot itself.

References 
  Fox, Ralph H.,  A quick trip through knot theory, in: M.K. Fort (Ed.), "Topology of 3-Manifolds and Related Topics", Prentice-Hall, NJ, 1961, pp. 120–167. 

 Dehn, Max, Die beiden Kleeblattschlingen, Mathematische Annalen 75 (1914), no. 3, 402–413.

Algebraic topology
Homotopy theory
Knot theory